A390 may refer to:

 The A390 road, a main road in the United Kingdom
 The Lechner A-390, an Olympic sailboard class
 The RFA Wave Ruler (A390), a British fleet auxiliary vessel